The American Airlines fleet is the largest in the world, comprising 935 mainline aircraft from both Boeing and Airbus. American Airlines is currently in the process of the largest fleet renewal in its history, with an additional 159 aircraft on order from Airbus and Boeing.

Over 80% of American's aircraft are narrow-bodies, mainly Airbus A320 family and the Boeing 737 family. It is the largest A320 family aircraft operator in the world, as well as the largest operator of the A319 and A321 variants. It is the fourth-largest operator of 737 family aircraft and second-largest operator of the 737-800 variant.

American's wide-body aircraft are all Boeing airliners. It is the third-largest operator of the Boeing 787 series and the sixth-largest operator of the Boeing 777 series.

American exclusively ordered Boeing aircraft throughout the 2000s. This strategy shifted on July 20, 2011, when American announced the largest combined aircraft order in history for 460 narrow-body jets including 260 aircraft from the Airbus A320 family. Additional Airbus aircraft joined the fleet in 2013 during the US Airways merger, which operated a nearly all Airbus fleet.

Current fleet
, American Airlines operates the following aircraft:

Gallery

Fleet history

Notes

References

American Airlines
Lists of aircraft by operator